Heike Matthiesen (born 27 June 1964) is a German classical guitarist.

Biography

Early life
Heike Matthiesen was born in Braunschweig into a family of classical musicians. From early childhood, she enjoyed comprehensive musical training, playing the piano from the age of four.

Education
Matthiesen took her first guitar lessons at the age of 18, and after one year she studied with professor Heinz Teuchert at the Frankfurt Conservatory.

Pepe Romero, who taught her for several years, was the formative influence on her playing. In addition, she attended a large number of master classes, inter alia with Manuel Barrueco, David Russell, Roland Dyens, Alvaro Pierri and Leo Brouwer.

Career
Apart from her solo commitments, Heike Matthiesen regularly performs with chamber music ensembles, and since 1997 has been closely affiliated with Villa Musica in Mainz. She has appeared with Los Romeros and, in 2005, recorded a CD with the Spanish Art Guitar Quartet (Bolero, NCA). Heike Matthiesen has performed in many different countries, including the US, Russia, Japan, China, all around western Europe, Iceland, Bulgaria, Ethiopia, Pakistan, Nigeria, and Equatorial Guinea.
She is a welcome guest at festivals and in guitar concert series and a juror in national and international competitions.

Heike Matthiesen is especially passionate about the music of female composers.

 "In our loud chaotic world there is a strong need for calmness and awareness of the presence (also for silence) and what else can bring that better to the people than the fragile sound of a guitar?"

Heike Matthiesen represents a new generation of classical musician, communicative, open for new media and an avid ambassador for classical music on all relevant social media platforms.

Guitars
Gioachino Giussani 1990 "Alsuhail", 
Roy Fankhänel 2015 "RF160"

Discography
 Suite de los espejos, André Volkonsky, Porträt, Wergo 1993
 Bolero, with the Spanish Art Guitar Quartet, NCA 2005
 Wozzeck, Alban Berg, Oper Frankfurt, DVD, Arthaus 2006

Solo:
 Sol y luna, music from Spain and South America, Tyrolis 1998
 Tristemusette, music by Roland Dyens, Tyrolis 2001
 Serenade, phantasies and variations on 19th century opera, Vienna2day 2013
 Guitar Ladies, Heike Matthiesen plays music by female composers from all around the world, Vienna2day Oct 2016

References

External links
 
 Website
 Video interview for La Chaîne Guitare 
 Interview with Heike Matthiesen at NEUGUITARS
 Review of Matthiesen's Guitar Ladies Album 
 YouTube channel of Heike Matthiesen 

1964 births
German classical guitarists
Contemporary Records artists
German women guitarists
Living people
Musicians from Braunschweig
Musicians from Frankfurt
Women classical guitarists